Castlevania: Bloodlines, known in Japan as  and in Europe and Australia as Castlevania: The New Generation, is a platform game developed and published by Konami in 1994 for the Sega Genesis, part of the Castlevania series. A vampire named Elizabeth Bartley is orchestrating the beginning of World War I as a sacrificial war to bring her uncle, Dracula, back to life. Players take on the role of Quincey Morris' son, John, and his friend Eric Lecarde to take up the fight against evil.

The development team approached Bloodlines as a unique Castlevania experience tailor-made for the Genesis. In this sense, the gameplay was made more fast and action-oriented. Writer Toshiki Yamamura also took creative liberties to craft what he viewed was a new chapter in the Castlevania saga. The game was the first Castlevania title for which Michiru Yamane composed music. She used her Bach influences to compose a renowned soundtrack, leading to her becoming a recurring series composer.

Bloodlines was released to positive reviews. It was re-released as part of the Castlevania Anniversary Collection on May 16, 2019, as well as the Sega Genesis Mini on September 19, 2019 and Nintendo Switch Online + Expansion Pack through the Sega Genesis App launch on October 25, 2021.

Gameplay

As with most early Castlevania games, players proceed through each level, defeating enemies and collecting gems to power special weapons: the axe, boomerang, and holy water. Each stage is sectioned, and has a sub-boss battle in the middle, with a main boss battle at the end. Some items increase the power of the characters' weapons. Some portions of the game split into different paths, depending on which character is chosen. John is able to swing past gaps with his whip, whereas Eric must use a different route by performing high jumps by using his spear.

Plot
In 1897, the long war between humanity and Dracula came to an end, as Dracula was laid to eternal rest by Quincy Morris, a distant descendant of the Belmont family. Peace was restored to Europe, until the outbreak of the First World War, which transformed the continent into a dark world filled with massacre and violence. At the beginning of the war, in June 1914 at Sarajevo, the Crown Prince of Austria was assassinated. It was said that a strange beautiful woman was involved, within the shadows. The woman was Elizabeth Bartley, who, in order to revive her uncle, Count Dracula, had conducted an unholy ceremony which caused the war, giving her possession of human souls from Europe.

The game itself takes place in 1917. The characters are John Morris, a distant descendant of the famed Belmont and Morris families who obeyed his fate to fight vampires day and night, and Eric Lecarde, whose girlfriend was transformed into a vampire when Elizabeth was revived. After Drolta Tzuentes resurrected Elizabeth Bartley by using black magic (Drolta is a subservient witch of Elizabeth), they traveled across Europe to conduct the resurrection of Count Dracula. John Morris and Eric Lecarde followed them. Even though the resurrection of Dracula was a success, the vampire hunters defeated him, and his allies.

Development

Bloodlines was developed by Konami in Tokyo. The concept behind the game was to develop a unique Castlevania experience for the Sega Genesis. In this sense, the gameplay was made fast and action-packed while retaining the strategic elements of previous games, and Eric was added as a playable character to add a distinct touch to the game. The game is a gaiden to the original Castlevania series. In fact, the game is also set in a wholly different era from previous games. Scenario writer Toshiki Yamamura took inspiration from novelist Hideyuki Kikuchi to craft his own interpretation of the series canon for Bloodlines. He viewed Bloodlines as the second act in a three-part Castlevania saga. The development team was challenged with the limitations of the Genesis's color palette, and the 8 megabit cart size, but felt they were able to craft a unique atmosphere with intricately animated characters despite this.

The music was composed by Michiru Yamane. Though already an established composer at Konami, Bloodlines was her first time composing for a Castlevania game. As the series was already popular and known for its music, she felt pressure to perform well. Having extensively studied Johann Sebastian Bach in university, Yamane felt a link between her classical music knowledge and the vampiric themes of the series, so she worked to integrate her style with the rock themes of previous Castlevania games. The development process required that Yamane program the music into the game, on top of composition. As she was already experienced with FM synthesis, she was comfortable doing this. Yamane went on to become a recurring composer for the Castlevania series.

Release 
Bloodlines was released worldwide in March 1994. The western version was made more difficult than the Japanese version. Packaging artwork for the North American version was illustrated by Tom duBois, who also designed artwork for other western releases of Konami games. The game underwent censorship during localization to PAL regions. Blood and violent imagery was removed from the game, and the title was changed to Castlevania: The New Generation to keep the word blood out of the game's title.

The game was first re-released as part of the Castlevania Anniversary Collection for PlayStation 4, Xbox One, Steam and Nintendo Switch in May 2019. It was also included in the Sega Genesis Mini dedicated console released later that year.

Reception

GamesRadar named Castlevania: Bloodlines the 8th best Genesis game of all time out of a list of 25. Game Informers Tim Turi praised the level of gore relative to other Castlevania titles at the time. He also called it "one of the most overlooked treasures in the franchise." In a 1997 Castlevania retrospective, GamePro said that while the graphics and sound were not as impressive as those of Super Castlevania IV, it was a strong game by Genesis standards.

Notes

References

Further reading

External links
Castlevania Bloodlines at MobyGames

1994 video games
1990s horror video games
Bloodlines
Konami games
Sega Genesis games
Single-player video games
Video games scored by Michiru Yamane
Video games set in the 1910s
Video games set in Romania
Video games set in Greece
Video games set in Italy
Video games set in Germany
Video games set in France
Video games set in England
Video games about curses
Video games about witchcraft
World War I video games
Cultural depictions of Elizabeth Báthory
Gargoyles in popular culture
Platform games
Fiction set in 1917
Nintendo Switch Online games
Video games developed in Japan